Visakha Stadium, also known as Prince Stadium, is a multi-use stadium in Phnom Penh, Cambodia.  It is currently used mostly for association football. The stadium holds 15,000 people. It is the home stadium of Cambodian Premier League team Visakha FC. The 2023 Southeast Asian Games will be held here.

Location
This stadium is located in Phnom Penh, Cambodia.

See also
 RCAF Old Stadium
 RSN Stadium

References

Sports venues in Cambodia
Football venues in Cambodia